Robert S. Tucker (born March 16, 1970) is an American businessman and philanthropist. He is chairman and CEO of T&M USA, LLC, a security and investigative services company based in New York City. He is the grandson of American operatic tenor Richard Tucker.

Career and education 

Robert S. Tucker graduated from George Washington University and Pace University School of Law.

Robert S. Tucker served as special assistant to the District Attorney in Queens County, Richard A. Brown. During his tenure he developed and implemented the Riding ADA Program, which established a 24/7-response commitment by assistant district attorneys to significant crime scenes.

In 1999 Tucker became chairman and CEO of T&M Protection Resources, a company specializing in security, intelligence and investigations. In 2004, Tucker brought on board four executives from the public and private sectors of the industry to manage T&M: Joseph M. Russo, formerly the special agent in charge of the U.S. Secret Service Clinton Protective Division, as vice president for executive protection operations; Robert H. Silbering, the former Special Narcotics Prosecutor for the City of New York, as president of its newly acquired FIA Investigations Division; John B. Goldsborough, a career executive from the security industry, as executive vice president to head corporate development; and Bob Wood as vice president for security services following a 20-year career with Allied Security and Barton Protective Services (now Allied Universal).

In 2007 Tucker restructured T&M as a limited liability company and sold a minority interest to Pegasus Capital Advisors as well as another private investor.

In 2008 Tucker and Pegasus commenced a plan to invest jointly in acquisitions of security companies in Israel which has resulted in T&M's subsidiary, T&M Holding Israel Ltd, becoming one of the largest security and janitorial service companies in the country with over 7,000 employees.

In 2009, Governor David Paterson appointed Tucker to serve as vice chairman of the New York State Security Guard Advisory Council, an advisory board to the governor supported by the New York State Division of Criminal Justice Services. Tucker was promoted to chairman of the Security Guard Advisory Council by Governor Cuomo in June 2013.

In 2012 Tucker divested T&M's U.S. security service business to Universal Protective Services of Orange, CA and its explosive detection canine operation to MSA Security of New York City with both transactions at record purchase multiples. In 2014, the Appellate Division of the Second Judicial Department of the Supreme Court of the State of New York appointed Tucker a member of the Committee on Character and Fitness for the Ninth Judicial District.

On January 1, 2021, Tucker purchased the shares of T&M Protection Resources, LLC from his private equity partners and reestablished the company as T&M USA, LLC.

Tucker continues to direct T&M's strategy to expand its capabilities as a security and investigative firm with a broader spectrum of risk management offerings. Current business services include Executive Protection & Secure Transportation; Security Consulting Services; Technical Surveillance Countermeasures; Background Investigations; Cyber Security & Investigations; Destination Intelligence Briefings; Financial Investigations; Global Due Diligence; Health Care Fraud & Abuse; Litigation Support; Sexual Misconduct Consulting & Investigations; Social Media Monitoring & Threat Analysis; and WebClear.

Philanthropy and community involvement 

Robert S. Tucker is vice president of the board of directors of the Richard Tucker Music Foundation and is a major fundraiser for the annual Richard Tucker Opera Gala, both of which are named after his grandfather. The foundation provides three grants to aspiring opera singers: the Richard Tucker Award, Richard Tucker Career grants, and Sara Tucker Study grants. Tucker's father, Barry Tucker, serves as president of the board.

On November 30, 2015, Tucker received the Distinguished Service Award from the Citizens Crime Commission of New York. The award was presented by the commission's president, Richard Aborn. The Distinguished Service Award recognizes individuals who have demonstrated an ongoing commitment to criminal justice innovation.

On November 18, 2016, Tucker received the Eugene R. Fink Award for his contributions to the security and investigations industry from the Associated Licensed Detectives of New York State (ALDONYS).

In January 2017, Westchester County Executive Robert P. Astorino appointed Tucker to serve as a Commissioner on the Westchester County Police Board.

On June 19, 2017, the New York Board of Rabbis in cooperation with the Mariano Rivera Foundation honored His Eminence Timothy Cardinal Dolan, Vincent Pitta and Tucker at its annual Humanitarian Awards Dinner.

On April 17, 2018, Big Brothers Big Sisters of New York City awarded Tucker the Public Service Award at its Annual Sidewalks of New York Dinner.

On December 5, 2018, Pace University appointed Tucker to its board of trustees.

In June 2020, Westchester County Executive George Latimer named Tucker to the Police Training Task Force. The Task Force was assembled "to review in detail all of the procedures and policies that are used at the County Police Academy to train new police recruits and to provide in-service training for those that are already working in law enforcement."

Tucker remains involved with his alma mater, Pace University. He gifted the funds necessary for the Pace Law Library to purchase its first real reference desk. He is co-chair of the Pace University Westchester President's Council and in 2012 was honored with a Pace University Leadership Award. In 2017, Tucker endowed the Robert Tucker Prize, an award for Prosecutorial Excellence to be awarded annually by The Elisabeth Haub School of Law at Pace University. The award's first recipient was Queens County District Attorney Richard Brown.

Tucker served a two-year term as president and a two-year term as chairman of the Associated Licensed Detectives of New York State (ALDONYS), an organization promoting the interests of licensed detectives. He was appointed on February 26, 2009.

Additionally, Tucker serves as board member for the following organizations:
 New York City Police Foundation
 FDNY Foundation
 White Plains Hospital
 Pace University

Tucker is an honorary Fire Commissioner and an honorary Police Commissioner of the City of New York.

Tucker is a former member of YPO (Young Presidents' Organization), Metro Chapter.

References 

1970 births
21st-century American businesspeople
American philanthropists
Living people